Đorđe Vasić (born 2 May 1964) is a Serbian football coach and former player who played as a midfielder.

Career
Vasić played for OFK Beograd, Rad and Partizan in his homeland Yugoslavia. In 1994, Vasić joined K League side Ilhwa Chunma. He later also played in China.

After retiring as a player, he became a coach and worked in several clubs in Serbia, mostly as an assistant. He was also the assistant coach of Ljubinko Drulović in the Serbian under-19 team, when they became European champions in 2013.

Honours
Ilhwa Chunma
 K League 1: 1994

References

External links
 

1964 births
Living people
People from Obrenovac
Yugoslav footballers
Serbia and Montenegro footballers
Association football midfielders
Yugoslav First League players
K League 1 players
OFK Beograd players
FK Rad players
FK Partizan players
Seongnam FC players
Serbia and Montenegro expatriate footballers
Serbia and Montenegro expatriate sportspeople in South Korea
Expatriate footballers in South Korea
Serbia and Montenegro expatriate sportspeople in China
Expatriate footballers in China
Serbian expatriate sportspeople in Saudi Arabia